The 2006 NAWIRA Women's Rugby Championship was the second edition of the tournament. It was held in Kingston, Jamaica from the 28th to the 30th of September. Jamaica won the championship, it was their first title win.

Final table

Results

References 

Women's rugby union competitions for national teams
Rugby union competitions in North America
Rugby union competitions in the Caribbean
Women's rugby union in North America